Not Only Mrs. Raut is a 2003 Indian Marathi social drama film directed by Gajendra Ahire. Aditi Deshpande, who plays the lead role of Mrs. Raut, has produced the film.

The film won National Award for Best Film in Marathi (Rajat Kamal) at the 51st National Film Awards for "its treatment of two women's struggle against male exploitation and domination".

Plot
Mrs. Vidya Raut murders her boss Karkhanis near Juhu Beach and surrenders herself to the police. She also submits the bloody dagger, weapon of murder. Swati Dandavate, a budding scholar advocate decides to fight her case. Her initial meetings with Mrs. Raut go waste as she keeps confessing her crime and is ready for the punishment. Convinced that something is hidden, Swati decides to find it out. Swati's husband Aditya, who is also an advocate, is now public prosecutor in this case. His elder brother and he try to convince Swati to drop the case which she would obviously lose. But standing against her family, Swati decides to dig out truth and defend Mrs. Raut.

Cast
 Aditi Deshpande as Mrs. Vidya Raut
 Madhura Velankar as Advocate Swati Dandavate
 Tushar Dalvi as Public Prosecutor Aditya Vishnu Dandavate
 Mohan Joshi as Advocate Dada Vishnu Dandavate
 Vandana Gupte
 Vikram Gokhale as Judge
 Kaushal Inamdar as Witness / Hotel Boy
 Ketaki Karadekar as Sneha
 Ravindra Mankani as Raghuvir Karkhanis
 Milind Shinde as Advocate S.M. Garud

Awards
The film won the Silver Lotus Award (Rajat Kamal) for Best Film in Marathi.

Aditi Deshpande won the Screen Best Actress - Marathi award for her performance of Mrs. Raut. She won this award jointly with Sonali Bendre, who played the role of Queen Sheelavati in Anahat (2003).

References

External links 
 
 

2003 films
Indian rape and revenge films
Best Marathi Feature Film National Film Award winners
Films directed by Gajendra Ahire
2000s Marathi-language films